Inopsis modulata is a moth of the family Erebidae. It was described by Henry Edwards in 1884. It is found in Mexico, Arizona and New Mexico.

The wingspan is about 38 mm. The head, collar and lower side of the abdomen are orange.

References

 

Lithosiina
Moths described in 1884